Presidential elections were held in Benin on 4 March 2001, with a second round run-off on 18 March. They controversially resulted in the re-election of Mathieu Kérékou for a second term. Kérékou's rival Nicéphore Soglo, who had been president from 1991 to 1996, failed in his bid to reclaim the presidency; although he qualified to participate in the second round of the election against Kérékou, he refused to do so, alleging electoral fraud. Adrien Houngbédji, the parliament speaker and third-placed candidate, also refused to participate in a second round. As a result, Kérékou faced fourth-place candidate Bruno Amoussou, who was planning minister and had already given his support to Kérékou, in the second round; Kérékou won an easy victory with 84% of the vote.

After the election, it was revealed that the Titan Corporation, a defense contractor based in the United States, had illegally provided $2 million to Kérékou's re-election campaign. The company pleaded guilty and agreed to pay $28.5 million in fines and civil penalties, the largest penalty under the Foreign Corrupt Practices Act up to that point, for bribery and filing false tax returns.

Results

References

Presidential elections in Benin
Benin
Presidential
Benin